Kevin Dwayne Galloway  (born May 23, 1988) is an Iraqi-American professional basketball player for Al Riyadi Beirut of the Lebanese Basketball League.

High school
Galloway attended Sacramento Charter High School, in Sacramento, California, where he played high school basketball.

College career
Galloway played NCAA Division I college basketball at USC (2006–2007), the College of Southern Idaho (2007–2008), Kentucky (2008–2009), and Texas Southern (2010–2011).

Professional career
Galloway began his pro career in the 2011–12 season, the NBA Development League's Idaho Stampede. In the 2014–15 season, he played with the Greek Basket League club Apollon Patras. In the 2015–16 season, he played with the Lebanese club Homenetmen Beirut B.C. till the end of 2016–17 season. In the 2017–18 season, he joined the Greek club Faros Larissas. He left Faros and joined Club Malvín of the Liga Uruguaya de Basketball. On October 4, 2018, Galloway came back to the Lebanese Basketball League, and he signed with Al Riyadi Beirut

National team career
Galloway became a naturalized citizen of Iraq, and was a member of the senior Iraqi national basketball team at the 2016 FIBA Asia Challenge, in Tehran, Iran. He led the Iraqi team in points, rebounds, assists, and steals at the tournament.

References

External links
 ESPN profile
 RealGM profile
 Asia-basket.com profile

1988 births
Living people
Al-Gharafa SC basketball players
American expatriate basketball people in Qatar
American men's basketball players
Apollon Patras B.C. players
Basketball players from Texas
Gymnastikos S. Larissas B.C. players
Idaho Stampede players
Iraqi men's basketball players
Iraqi people of African-American descent
Kentucky Wildcats men's basketball players
Naturalised citizens of Iraq
Point guards
San-en NeoPhoenix players
Shooting guards
Small forwards
Southern Idaho Golden Eagles men's basketball players
Texas Southern Tigers men's basketball players
USC Trojans men's basketball players
Al Riyadi Club Beirut basketball players